Fargues may refer to:

Communes in France 
 Fargues, Gironde, in the Gironde department 
 Fargues, Landes, in the Landes department 
 Fargues, Lot, in the Lot department 
 Fargues-Saint-Hilaire, in the Gironde department
 Fargues-sur-Ourbise, in the Lot-et-Garonne department

People 
 Annie Fargue (1934—2011), French actress 
 Léon-Paul Fargue (1876–1947), French poet and essayist
 Maria Fargues Gimeno (b. 1980), Spanish ski mountaineer
 Maurice Fargues (1913–1947), diver with the French Navy and a close associate of Jacques Cousteau
 Nicolas Fargues (b. 1972), French novelist
 Laurent Fargues (b. 1975), French mathematician